These 130 species belong to Callistethus, a genus of shining leaf chafers in the family Scarabaeidae.

Callistethus species

 Callistethus aegrus (Ohaus, 1916)
 Callistethus agnellus (Arrow, 1911)
 Callistethus amphilissus (Arrow, 1917)
 Callistethus andoi Wada, 2015
 Callistethus anwari (Abdullah & Roohi, 1969)
 Callistethus armatus (Arrow, 1911)
 Callistethus ashrafii (Abdullah & Roohi, 1968)
 Callistethus auronitens (Hope, 1835)
 Callistethus benicolus (Ohaus, 1897)
 Callistethus buchwaldianus (Ohaus, 1908)
 Callistethus buddahnus Miyake, 1989
 Callistethus bugnioni (Gillet, 1924)
 Callistethus burmeisteri (Lansberge, 1879)
 Callistethus callewaerti (Ohaus, 1914)
 Callistethus calonotus (Bates, 1888)
 Callistethus carbo Filippini, Galante & Micó, 2015
 Callistethus catoptricus (Ohaus, 1916)
 Callistethus chalcosomus (Blanchard, 1850)
 Callistethus chloromelus (Arrow, 1911)
 Callistethus chlorotoides (Bates, 1888)
 Callistethus chontalensis (Bates, 1888)
 Callistethus chrysanthe (Bates, 1888)
 Callistethus chrysomelinus (Bates, 1888)
 Callistethus coeruleus (Ohaus, 1908)
 Callistethus cupricollis 
 Callistethus curtisi (Waterhouse, 1881)
 Callistethus daruma Wada, 2000
 Callistethus dechambrei Wada, 1998
 Callistethus degeneratus (Arrow, 1911)
 Callistethus ebenus (Burmeister, 1855)
 Callistethus epicholicus (Ohaus, 1914)
 Callistethus excellens (Nonfried, 1894)
 Callistethus excisipennis Linnaeus, 1981
 Callistethus flavodorsalis Filippini, Galante & Micó, 2015
 Callistethus formosanus Kobayashi, 1987
 Callistethus fusciventris (Ohaus, 1926)
 Callistethus fuscorubens Filippini, Galante & Micó, 2015
 Callistethus fuscus Wada, 1998
 Callistethus gemmulus (Arrow, 1911)
 Callistethus glandulicollis Ohaus, 1914
 Callistethus granulipygus (Bates, 1888)
 Callistethus hauschildti (Ohaus, 1903)
 Callistethus hiekei (Frey, 1968)
 Callistethus insignis (Lansberge, 1880)
 Callistethus irrorellus (Castelnau, 1840)
 Callistethus isolatus (Arrow, 1917)
 Callistethus keili (Ritsema, 1893)
 Callistethus ladino (Ohaus, 1902)
 Callistethus laevigatus 
 Callistethus lativittis Filippini, Galante & Micó, 2015
 Callistethus lepidus (Burmeister, 1844)
 Callistethus levigatus Filippini, Galante & Micó, 2015
 Callistethus levii (Blanchard, 1850)
 Callistethus lubricus (Ohaus, 1915)
 Callistethus macroxantholeus Filippini, Galante & Micó, 2015
 Callistethus maculatus (Guérin-Méneville, 1834)
 Callistethus madurae (Arrow, 1911)
 Callistethus magnificus Wada, 1998
 Callistethus malayus (Ohaus, 1932)
 Callistethus marginatus (Fabricius, 1792)
 Callistethus marginicollis 
 Callistethus masayukii Wada, 2000
 Callistethus metallicus (Benderitter, 1923)
 Callistethus microxantholeus Filippini, Galante & Micó, 2015
 Callistethus mimeloides (Ohaus, 1902)
 Callistethus mindanaoensis Wada, 2002
 Callistethus mojo (Ohaus, 1897)
 Callistethus morio (Ohaus, 1913)
 Callistethus multiplicatus Filippini, Galante & Micó, 2015
 Callistethus myanmarensis Fujioka & Kobayashi, 2012
 Callistethus nakanei Wada, 1998
 Callistethus naponensis (Ohaus, 1897)
 Callistethus nicoya (Ohaus, 1928)
 Callistethus nuptus (Ohaus, 1905)
 Callistethus oculicollis (Arrow, 1911)
 Callistethus palawanensis Wada, 1998
 Callistethus parapulcher Filippini, Galante & Micó, 2015
 Callistethus parvus (Arrow, 1917)
 Callistethus picturatus (Candèze, 1869)
 Callistethus plagiicollis 
 Callistethus porcatus (Blanchard, 1850)
 Callistethus princeps (Kraatz, 1892)
 Callistethus pseudocollaris Filippini, Galante & Micó, 2015
 Callistethus pseudolepidus Morón & Nogueira, 2002
 Callistethus pterygophorus Ohaus, 1903
 Callistethus pulchra (Blanchard, 1850)
 Callistethus puncticollis (Kirsch, 1885)
 Callistethus pyritosus (Erichson, 1847)
 Callistethus pyropus (Nonfried, 1890)
 Callistethus pyropygus (Nonfried, 1891)
 Callistethus pyroscelis (Hope, 1841)
 Callistethus qaudrii (Abdullah & Roohi, 1968)
 Callistethus rachelae (Arrow, 1917)
 Callistethus regina (Newman, 1838)
 Callistethus riedeli (Lansberge, 1880)
 Callistethus rosenbergi (Ohaus, 1902)
 Callistethus rufomicans (Ohaus, 1897)
 Callistethus rugilaterus (Arrow, 1911)
 Callistethus ruteloides Filippini, Galante & Micó, 2015
 Callistethus shafqati (Abdullah & Roohi, 1968)
 Callistethus similis Wada, 1998
 Callistethus somai Wada, 2002
 Callistethus spiniferus (Ohaus, 1915)
 Callistethus stannibractea Filippini, Galante & Micó, 2015
 Callistethus stoliczkae (Sharp, 1878)
 Callistethus stolidopygus (Ohaus, 1915)
 Callistethus strigatus (Castelnau, 1840)
 Callistethus strigidiodes (Blanchard, 1850)
 Callistethus sulawesiensis Wada, 1999
 Callistethus sulcans (Bates, 1888)
 Callistethus sulcipennis (Castelnau, 1840)
 Callistethus suratus (Burmeister, 1844)
 Callistethus tigrinus (Nonfried, 1906)
 Callistethus tlapanecus Ramírez-Ponce & Morón, 2012
 Callistethus tondanoensis Wada, 2002
 Callistethus tricostulatus (Ohaus, 1897)
 Callistethus trivittatus (Perty, 1831)
 Callistethus tumidicauda (Arrow, 1912)
 Callistethus valdecostatus (Bates, 1888)
 Callistethus vanpatteni (Bates, 1888)
 Callistethus varius (Newman, 1839)
 Callistethus vietnamensis Fujioka & Kobayashi, 2012
 Callistethus viridiflava (Ohaus, 1925)
 Callistethus vitricus Fujioka & Kobayashi, 2012
 Callistethus wallandi (Candèze, 1869)
 Callistethus xantholeus (Bates, 1888)
 Callistethus xanthonotus (Arrow, 1917)
 Callistethus xiphostethus (Bates, 1888)
 Callistethus yalizo Filippini, Galante & Micó, 2015
 Callistethus yunusi (Abdullah & Roohi, 1969)

References

Callistethus